Benton Field , also known as Benton Airpark, is a city-owned public-use airport located one mile (1.6 km) west of the central business district of Redding, a city in Shasta County, California, United States. It is one of two airports located in the City of Redding, the other being Redding Municipal Airport.

The airport is named for Lt. John W. Benton, an Army Air Corps pilot and a Shasta County resident who died in an airplane crash at Buenos Aires in 1927. The original small airstrip opened on July 4, 1929.

Disambiguation
Benton Field was also one name used during the 1930s by the United States Army Air Corps to refer to the airport which later became the Naval Air Station Alameda (on the east side of San Francisco Bay) during World War II.

Facilities and aircraft
The airport features parallel taxiways on both the East and West side of the runway with parking and hangars on each side of the runway.

During 2002 the airport had 35,000 aircraft operations, an average of 95 per day: 97% general aviation and 3% air taxi. There are 122 aircraft based at this airport: 93% single-engine, 5% multi-engine and 2% helicopter.

Benton Field is the headquarters of the California Highway Patrol Northern Division Air Operations unit. The unit includes two single-engine CHP airplanes and two CHP helicopters based at the airpark.

References

External links

Experimental Aircraft Association Chapter 157, based at Benton Field

Airports in Shasta County, California
Buildings and structures in Redding, California